Mordecai Shehori (born 20 April 1946) is an Israeli-American pianist.

Biography
Shehori was born in Israel and studied in Tel Aviv with Mindru Katz, whom he cites as his most influential teacher. At the age of nine he gave his first public performance. Later he received first prize in the Beethoven Competition and received the American Israel Cultural Foundation Award. In New York, he studied with Claude Frank at the Mannes College of Music and graduated from the Juilliard School.

Shehori made his New York debut after winning the 1974 Jeunesses Musicales Competition. He concertises in the United States, Canada, and Europe and has performed at various music festivals and at the White House. He has given 27 different recital programs in New York in as many years. His commercial recordings for Connoisseur Society and Cembal d'amour include music by Beethoven, Chopin, Scarlatti, Liszt, Rameau, Rachmaninoff, and many others.  He is a two-time recipient of the La Gesse Foundation Award, and is listed on the roster of Steinway & Sons.

From 1971 to 1982, Shehori was piano teacher to Isaac and Vera Stern's children. In spite of that In 2014, Shehori has stated that Stern used his total control of the music world as the president of Carnegie Hall to dictate managements, presenters, record companies who he approves and who according to him should NOT  have a career in music.

In February 1987, Shehori assisted Vladimir Horowitz in preparing Mozart's Piano Concerto K.488, playing the orchestral reduction on second piano, while Horowitz played the concerto's solo part.  This took place in the basement of Steinway & Sons in New York City.  Later that year, Horowitz traveled to Milan and recorded the concerto for Deutsche Grammophon with the La Scala Theater Orchestra conducted by Carlo Maria Giulini.

Horowitz was so pleased with Shehori's accompaniment that he began to invite him to his home on East 94th Street.  Shehori spent many evenings with the Horowitzes.  Shehori acted as page turner for Horowitz in what turned out to be the sessions for his final recording in Horowitz's New York home from October 24, 1989 to November 1, 1989.  Horowitz died just a few days later, on November 5, 1989.  Shehori has cited his friendship and artistic collaboration with Vladimir Horowitz as a significant source of knowledge and inspiration.

“Mordecai Shehori’s concert served as a welcome reminder that there is a place for originality in re-creations of classical materials.”

The New York Times

Making a Lost Style Speak to Today’s Ears (Headline)

"Mr. Shehori readings are a fascinating reminder that the largely vanished performance style he has espouse took in not only bombastic, flashy playing, but also the gentlest and sweetest of pianissimos.”

The New York Times

“Mordecai Shehori is a musician’s musician—that is, a sort of

pianist whom it will profit other pianists to study.  But there is no

reason why the general public shouldn't know of him, too, for he

brings unity, proportion, intelligence and sensitivity to all that he

plays."

New York Newsday

Shehori: Poetry in Music (Headline)

"Shehori’s temperament seems to hunt out the poetry in musical

form, the spiritual content of each score."

The Washington Post

“Shehori is rock solid and deeply musical. This is a big—hearted interpretation, with a beautiful variety of tone colour and a sense of empathy with the composer."

BBC Music Magazine

“Everything he tackled on this formidable program emerged Colorful and brightly characterized, the combination of great confidence, a lively imagination, and excellent technique." 

The Boston Globe

"Shehori is a man with exceptional gifts. Technically he is extremely accomplished, although this facility is always employed to serve his larger musical goals. As well, there is always a concern on Shehori's part for the architectural design of the music and the need to impart this message to the listener." 

The Gazette, Montreal

“Mordecai Shehori is a marvelous pianist in almost every conceivable category. Indeed, if elegance had a middle name, it would be Shehori. At last here is a pianist who not only understand the power of gentleness but puts it to work at every opportunity. Though it goes without saying that is technique is impeccable, something more is afoot when he plays, as he found a way to harness the storm before the calm.”

American Record Guide

“If one titles his Liszt recital  “Love and the Devil” he’d better play like the Devil—and Shehori does. Color, voltage, and volatility dissolve Liszt’s glittering sound masses so fluently into surges of sheer expressiveness that the piano seems an extension of Shehori’s antic disposition….Mephisto’s scraping enchantments, for once, evince genuine seductiveness, sensual magic.”

Fanfare Magazine

References

Reviews of Concerts
 Ericson, Raymond, et al. (1974). "Music in Review; Israeli Pianist in Debut Here" New York Times. March 24.
 (1976). "Mordecai Shehori Gives Piano Recital" New York Times. June 3.
 Ericson, Raymond (1979). "Piano Recital: Shehori Plays Three Sonatas". New York Times. May 26.
Page, Tim (1984). "Music: Mordecai Shehori" New York Times. May 18.
Rivers, Kate (1984). "Shehori: Poetry in Music" The Washington Post. November 3.
Kimmelman, Michael (1987). "Recital: Mordecai Shehori, Pianist, At Merkin Hall." New York Times. May 22.
Crutchfield, Will (1989). "Review/Piano; Hearing More Than Beethoven Set Down." New York Times. June 9.
Henahan, Donal (1990). "Review/Piano; A Recitalist to Undermine a Critic." New York Times. May 9.
Holland, Bernard (1995). "In Performance; Classical Music - A Pianist Reconciles 2 Composers' Contrasts" New York Times. June 12.
Kozinn, Allan (1997). "Classical Music in Review: Signs of a Poet, And a Daredevil" New York Times. May 22.
Kozinn, Allan (2003). "Music in Review: Classical Music; Making a Lost Style Speak to Today's Ears" New York Times. June 17.
Schultz, Rick (2007). "A touch of Horowitz amid patter and pooches" Los Angeles Times. June 12.

Reviews of Recordings
Kozinn, Allan (1991). "Record Brief - D. Scarlatti: Keyboard Sonatas (6); Beethoven: Piano Sonata No. 3; Brahms: Paganini Variations (Op. 35)  Mordecai Shehori, piano. Connoisseur Society CD4177; CD." New York Times. September 29.
Duchen, Jessica. "Schubert/Liszt/Fauré, Mordecai Shehori (piano)" BBC Music Magazine.
Distler, Jed. "Review: Learning by Example Volume 2." Classicstoday.com.
Distler, Jed. "The New York Recitals Volume 1." Classicstoday.com.
Turok, Paul. "Turok's Choice - April 2001" Andante.com.
Lemco, Gary (July 2002). "Liszt: Love and the Devil" Audiophile Audition.
Woolf, Jonathan (December 2002). "Classical CD Review - Rameau  Mordecai Shehori, piano" Musicweb-International.com.
Woolf, Jonathan (January 2003). "Classical CD Review - New York Recitals Volume 1  Mordecai Shehori, piano" Musicweb-International.com.
Woolf, Jonathan (February 2003). "Classical CD Review - Franz Liszt Volume 1  Mordecai Shehori, piano" Musicweb-International.com.
Woolf, Jonathan (April 2003). "Classical CD Review - Bach arr. Siloti, Handel, Beethoven, Chopin, Schubert arr. Liszt, Liszt  Mordecai Shehori, piano" Musicweb-International.com.
Woolf, Jonathan (March 2006). "Classical CD Review - Mozart, Beethoven, Chopin, Liszt  Mordecai Shehori, piano" Musicweb-International.com.
[ Brownell, Mike (January 2008). "The Celebrated New York Concerts - Vol 2" Allmusicguide.com.]
Woolf, Jonathan (March 2008). "Classical CD Review - Celebrated New York Concerts Volume 2  Mordecai Shehori, piano" Musicweb-International.com.
Woolf, Jonathan (June 2008). "Mordecai Shehori Learning by Example Vols 1-3" Musicweb-International.com.
Woolf, Jonathan (June 2008). "The Celebrated New York Concerts Volume 3  Mordecai Shehori, piano" Musicweb-International.com.
Haylock, Julian (July 2008). "The Celebrated New York Concerts Volume 3  Mordecai Shehori, piano" International Piano Magazine.
Lemco, Gary (July 2008). "The Celebrated New York Concerts Volume 2" Audiophile Audition.
Lemco, Gary (January 2009). "The Celebrated New York Concerts Volume 3" Audiophile Audition.
Woolf, Jonathan (February 2009). "CD Review - Mordecai Shehori plays Schumann & Liszt" Musicweb-International.com.
Lemco, Gary (July 2009). "Shehori plays Mozart" Audiophile Audition.
Lemco, Gary (September 2009). "Shehori plays Russian Music" Audiophile Audition.
Lemco, Gary (June 2010). "BACH-BUSONI: Ten Chorale-Preludes; Chaconne in D Minor, from BWV 1004; Organ Toccata in C Major, BWV 564 - Mordecai Shehori, piano" Audiophile Audition.
Lemco, Gary (September 2010). "Moscheles and Fetis: 'Methode des Methodes' - Mordecai Shehori, piano" Audiophile Audition.
Lemco, Gary (January 2011). "Chopin Volume I: 19 Waltzes - Mordecai Shehori, piano" Audiophile Audition.

External links
 Bach Cantatas.com page on Mordecai Shehori
Commercial discography of Mordecai Shehori
Biographical notes on Mordecai Shehori
The Papers of Vladimir and Wanda Toscanini Horowitz  Irving S. Gilmore Music Library, Yale University. Photographs of Horowitz taken by Mordecai Shehori
Article by Mordecai Shehori describing his friendship and artistic collaboration with Vladimir Horowitz
David Dubal interview with Mordecai Shehori (1 of 2), WNCN-FM, 6-Feb-1981
David Dubal interview with Mordecai Shehori (2 of 2), WNCN-FM, 22-Jan-1982
 La Gesse Foundation Award past winners
 Steinway Artists roster

Israeli classical pianists
American classical pianists
Male classical pianists
American male pianists
Living people
1946 births
Jewish classical pianists
20th-century American pianists
21st-century classical pianists
20th-century American male musicians
21st-century American male musicians
21st-century American pianists